The inaugural Liverpool City Region mayoral election was held on 4 May 2017 to elect the Liverpool City Region Combined Authority and won by Steve Rotheram. Subsequent elections were planned for May 2020 but were postponed until May 2021 due to the covid pandemic with subsequent elections due every four years. The metro mayor will have control over the whole Liverpool City Region combined authority area which consists of the following local authorities: 
 Halton
 Knowsley
 Liverpool
 St Helens
 Sefton
 Wirral
The mayor will work with existing city and borough leaders to take forward the mayor's strategic plan. The metro mayor will have a budget of £900 million over 30 years with powers on education & skills, planning and housing, transport, health and social care.

Background
Combined authorities were introduced in England outside Greater London by the Local Democracy, Economic Development and Construction Act 2009 to cover areas larger than the existing local authorities but smaller than the regions. Combined authorities are created voluntarily and allow a group of local authorities to pool appropriate responsibility and receive certain delegated functions from central government in order to deliver transport and economic policy more effectively over a wider area.  There are currently six such authorities, with the Greater Manchester Combined Authority established on 1 April 2011, Liverpool City Region Combined Authority and three others established in April 2014, and a sixth in April 2016. If only two candidates stand, then  the election is conducted under the first past the post (FPTP) voting system, where the candidate with the most votes is elected. If there are three or more candidates, as in 2017, the outcome will be determined by the supplementary vote system (SV). Voters make both a first and second choice, with any candidate securing more than half of the first-preference vote being elected. If no candidate reaches this threshold, then all candidates except those in first and second place are eliminated. Second-preference votes from these candidates are transferred over, and whoever has the most votes is elected.

Candidates
Conservative Party
Conservative candidate Tony Caldeira is a businessman and was candidate for Mayor of Liverpool in 2012 and 2016.

Caldeira's key policies were to:
 Improve transport networks
 Reduce planning processes
 Deliver faster economic growth
 Increase jobs and skills
 Prioritise brownfield sites over greenspace for the building of new homes and workplaces

Get The Coppers Off The Jury
Candidate Paul Breen previously ran as an Independent in the 2007 Liverpool City Council elections for Norris Green. No manifesto has been published with Breen stating that the party's name speaks for itself.

Green Party of England and Wales
Green Party candidate Tom Crone, Leader of the Green Group on Liverpool City Council and 2016 Liverpool mayoral candidate winning 11% of the vote.

Crone's key policies were to:
 Protect greenspaces by promoting development on brownfield sites
 Invest in training and education for jobs in the low carbon industry
 Prioritise a move to a low-carbon economy by supporting low carbon businesses and initiatives
 Tackle air pollution
 Invest in green energy and oppose fracking
 Invest in public transport, walking and cycling to reduce reliance upon cars
 Promote a move to non-diesel private and public transport 
 Make more public land available to community-led housing projects
 Introduction of citizen forums
 Creation of an elected assembly to scrutinise the City Region mayor
 Commitment to gender, age and BAME balance in regional authority staffing

Labour Party

Labour candidate Steve Rotheram had been MP for Liverpool Walton since 2010, Parliamentary Private Secretary to the Leader of the Opposition since 2015, and former Lord Mayor of Liverpool.

Rotheram's key policies are to:
 Improve education
 Make brownfield sites more attractive to developers
 Cut the cost of Merseytravel's Fast Tag electronic pre-payment system

Liberal Democrats
Liberal Democrat candidate Councillor Carl Cashman is leader of the Liberal Democrat Group on Knowsley Council having been elected in 2016. At 25 years old he is the youngest of the candidates.

Cashman's key policies were to:
 Open a Liverpool City Region representative office in Brussels, Belgium.
 A Referendum on the terms the UK leaves the European Union, with the option to remain a member of the EU
 Make Merseytravel's Walrus card a reflection of London's Oyster card
 Remove tunnel tolls
 Protect greenspace
 Create a brownfield co-operative

Trade Unionist and Socialist Coalition (TUSC)
TUSC candidate Roger Bannister is a member the UNISON public services union, is secretary of a local UNISON Branch and a member of UNISON’s National Executive Council. He previous ran for mayor of Liverpool in the 2016 Liverpool mayoral elections receiving 5% of the votes.

Bannister's key policies were to:
 Oppose austerity
 Oppose cuts in public expenditure
 Adopt policies to revive the Liverpool City Region
 Support the rail guards
 Keep Liverpool Women’s Hospital open
 Reverse approval for new driver-only Merseyrail trains

UK Independence Party (UKIP)
UKIP candidate Paula Walters is a civil servant and chairwoman of UKIP Wirral. With no previous business experience she has previously campaigned against bridge and tunnel tolls.

Walters' key policies were to:
 Remove on bridge and tunnel tolls namely Runcorn Bridge, Queensway Tunnel and Kingsway Tunnel
 Ensure money is spent wisely
 Distribute money across the region fairly
 Listen to local residents
 Support small businesses
 Support young people

Women's Equality Party
The Women's Equality Party candidate Tabitha Morton is Head of Integration at lock manufacturer Yale.

Morton's key policies were to:
 Reduce domestic violence against women and girls
 Make sure women have a voice in important decisions
 Support women lead businesses to reduce the gender pay gap
 Set aside funds to train women in sectors where women are underrepresented

Results

Overall election result

Results by local authority

Halton

Knowsley

Liverpool

Sefton

St Helens

Wirral

References

External links 

 Centre for Cities

2017 English local elections
Elections in Merseyside
Mayoral elections in England
May 2017 events in the United Kingdom
2010s in Merseyside